Paul Francis Zhang Mingqian (October 26, 1917 - July 24, 2005) was a Chinese Catholic priest, Franciscan, doctor, prisoner for faith. He was recognized as a legal bishop by both the Holy See and the Chinese government.

Biography
He came from a Catholic family from Jingmen, Hubei. In 1938 he joined the Franciscan High Priest Seminary at the Roman Catholic Archdiocese of Hankou. In 1944 he was ordained a priest and returned to the Roman Catholic Diocese of Yichang. In addition, Paul Francis Zhang Mingqian received medical education and was a doctor.

In 1947 he founded a clinic in Jingmen, where he was also a parish priest. After the advent of Communist rule, he worked at the local hospital. In 1958 or 1959, the Catholic Patriotic Association chose him as its Bishop of the Roman Catholic Diocese of Yichang. On August 15, 1959, he received the episcopal consecration at the hands of the excommunicated anti-Bishop Hankou Bernardin Dong Guangqing OFM. Accepting sacra without the consent of the Pope, Zhang was excommunicated from church. In later years, however, he was reconciled with the Pope and received the approval of the Holy See.

During the Cultural Revolution, he was sentenced to reeducation through work, but thanks to medical education he avoided the camp and punished him while working in the hospital in Yichang. Released in 1978, he returned to the diocese, which he led until his death in 2005. At the same time, until 1982, he worked as a physician, transferring his earnings to the seminarians he initially taught personally. He also practiced afterwards giving medical advice to sick priests and faithful.

References

External links
 GCatholic
 
 AsiaNews Franciscan Doctor-Bishop Of Yichang Dies At Age 88
 ucanews.com

1917 births
People from Jingmen
2005 deaths
21st-century Roman Catholic bishops in China
20th-century Roman Catholic bishops in China
Bishops of the Catholic Patriotic Association